Ophiclinus gracilis, the Black-back snake-blenny, is a species of clinid native to the coastal waters of southern Australia where it prefers areas with rotting vegetation on silty substrates.  It can reach a maximum length of  TL.

References

gracilis
Fish described in 1906
Taxa named by Edgar Ravenswood Waite